SS William B. Wilson was a Liberty ship built in the United States during World War II. She was named after William B. Wilson, the first United States Secretary of Labor.

Construction
William B. Wilson was laid down on 14 September 1943, under a Maritime Commission (MARCOM) contract, MC hull 1537, by J.A. Jones Construction, Panama City, Florida; she was launched on 6 November 1943.

History
She was allocated to Eastern Steamship Co., on 16 December 1943. She was one of eight special ships, a Z-EC2-S-C2, a Tank carrier. She was built with larger cargo hold hatches and stronger crane lifts. J.A.Jones Construction built the eight Z-EC2-S-C2 Tank carrier in 1943.  On 10 October 1945, she was laid up in the National Defense Reserve Fleet, in the James River Group, Lee Hall, Virginia. On 31 July 1972, she was sold for $75,500 to N.V. Intershitra, Rotterdam, for scrapping. She was removed from the fleet on 25 August 1972.

References

Bibliography

 
 
 
 
 

 

Liberty ships
Ships built in Panama City, Florida
1943 ships
James River Reserve Fleet